The 1955 Yale Bulldogs football team represented Yale University in the 1955 college football season.  The Bulldogs were led by fourth-year head coach Jordan Olivar, played their home games at the Yale Bowl and finished the season with a 7–2 record.

This would be Yale's final year as a football independent, as the Ivy League, which Yale had helped co-found in 1954, began football competition in 1956. Six of the nine opponents on the Bulldogs' 1955 schedule were Ivy League members (with Penn the only Ivy not scheduled); for decades, (future) Ivy members had comprised a large portion of Yale's opponents.

Schedule

References

Yale
Yale Bulldogs football seasons
Yale Bulldogs football